Ronald Dashon Holland (born July 7, 2005) is an American basketball player who currently attends Duncanville High School. Holland has committed to playing basketball for the University of Texas.

Early life and high school
Holland grew up in Duncanville, Texas and attends Duncanville High School. He averaged 13.8 points and 10.1 rebounds per game during his sophomore season as the Duncanville Panthers won a second straight Texas Class 6A state championship. Holland led Duncanville to a 35-1 record and a third consecutive state championship as a junior while averaging 15.9 points, 7.9 rebounds, 2.9 assists, and 2.0 steals per game. Holland was selected to play in the 2023 McDonald's All-American Boys Game during his senior year. He was also selected to play for Team USA in the Nike Hoops Summit.

Recruiting
Holland is a consensus five-star recruit and one of the top players in the 2023 class, according to major recruiting services. He is ranked as the best recruit in the state of Texas. Holland committed to play college basketball at Texas over offers from Kentucky, Memphis, Kansas, Arkansas, Oklahoma State, UCLA, and Oregon. He reaffirmed his commitment after Texas head coach Chris Beard was fired in January 2023.

National team career
Holland played for the United States national under-16 team at the 2021 FIBA Under-16 Americas Championship. He was named to the All-Tournament team after averaging 19.0 points and 10.2 rebounds per game as the United States won the gold medal. The following summer, Holland played for the under-17 team at the 2022 FIBA Under-17 Basketball World Cup and averaged 11.1 points and 6.6 rebounds over seven games.

References

External links
USA Basketball bio

2005 births
Living people
American men's basketball players
Basketball players from Texas
Power forwards (basketball)